Sophia Green (born 2000) is a Scottish triathlete. She competed at the 2022 Commonwealth Games in Women's Triathlon .

She studied at University of Stirling.

She competed at 2021 Europe Triathlon Cup Coimbra finishing first, and 2022 Europe Triathlon Cup Coimbra finishing 15th.

She trains with  Moray Road Runners, and Moray Firth Triathlon Club.

She competed at the 2022 Commonwealth Games where she came 17th in the women's event.

References 

2000 births
Scottish female triathletes
Living people
Triathletes at the 2022 Commonwealth Games
Commonwealth Games competitors for Scotland
21st-century Scottish women
Alumni of the University of Stirling
People from Elgin, Moray
Sportspeople from Moray